Exercise Fabius was a formal exercise for the Allied Operation Neptune in World War II. The other was Exercise Tiger, which had occurred a week earlier.

The exercise was planned to start on 2 May 1944, but bad weather delayed it to the next day.
It consisted of six separate exercises:

 Fabius 1: elements of the 1st Infantry Division and 29th Infantry Division (United States) practised amphibious landing at Slapton Sands.
 Fabius 2: elements of the 50th Infantry Division practised landings at Hayling Island.
 Fabius 3: elements of the 3rd Canadian Infantry Division practised landings at Bracklesham Bay.
 Fabius 4: elements of the 3rd Infantry Division and associated units practised landing at Littlehampton.
 Fabius 5 and 6: practice for American and British forces working on buildup of forces and supplies on Allied beaches.

They formed the largest amphibious training exercise of the war. As the final exercise before Operation Neptune, it resembled closely the final operation and no major changes could be made to Operation Neptune.

References

Bibliography

Western European theatre of World War II
Fabius
1944 in England
Military history of Devon
Military history of Hampshire
Military history of Sussex